When a gemstone is desired to be used in jewelry, it is cut depending on the size and shape of the rough stone, as well as the desired piece of jewelry to be made. As a general rule, a cut gemstone will reduce the mass (described in the carat) by about 50 percent.

There are several techniques available to work with gemstones; among them are sawing, grinding, sanding, lapping, polishing, grilling, and tumbling. The diamond cut planning stage is a complex process that requires the cutter to work with unique rough stones. Very often, the location of the inclusions in a rough stone will determine the type of shape to which a diamond may be cut. For economic reasons, most diamonds are cut to retain weight instead of maximizing brilliance.

Types

A list of cuts:

Antwerp rose cut
Asscher cut
Baguette cut
Barion cut
Brilliant cut
Briolette
Cabochon
Calla Cut
Ceylon cut
Cushion or old mine cut
Double Dutch rose cut
Emerald cut
Flanders cut
French cut
Heart brilliant
India cut
King brilliant
Kite brilliant
Line-Cut
Lozenge cut
Magna brilliant
Marquise or navette cut
Mogul cut
Obus cut
Oval brilliant
Pear or drop brilliant
Pendeloque cut
Princess cut
Radiant cut
Rose or rosette cut
Round brilliant
Single or eight cut
Square emerald
Star brilliant
Step cut
Transitional cut
Trapezoid or trapeze cut
Trilliant cut, a.k.a. trillian or triangle cut
Whirl cut

See also

Diamond cut

References

Further reading
 Warren, Larter (1936). The Line-Cut Diamond, pp.  19–20. Gemological Institute of America, USA, Vol. 2, No. 2 (Summer 1936)
 Shipley, Robert M. (1936). Gemological Glossary, pp.  7. Gemological Institute of America, USA, Vol. 2, No. 4 (Winter 1936)

External links